Zweibrücken Observatory, or the Zweibrück Observatory of the Natural Science Association, is a public observatory in Zweibrücken, Germany. Its dome was painted to resemble the Star Wars character R2-D2 in 2018.

Construction 
The observatory is located on a hill in the Zweibrücken campus of the University of Applied Sciences, Kaiserslautern. In 1999, the Zweibrücken scientific association was founded, with plans to construct an observatory. In 2002 the  diameter dome was erected. The construction was an initiative of Professor Peter Pokrowsky.

R2-D2 
In September 2018, the telescope dome was painted to resemble the R2-D2 robot from Star Wars by a team led by Hubert Zitt. It was the second observatory dome to be painted in such a way, following from Goodsell Observatory in 2010. The repainting took 120 man-hours. It gained internet fame after a post on Twitter by Star Wars actor Mark Hamill.

See also 
 List of astronomical observatories

References 

Astronomical observatories in Germany
Star Wars